MTV Brand New was a 24-hour specialist music channel featuring new music videos, alternative and indie music available in the Netherlands, Germany. In Italy, it was replaced by MTV Rocks in 2011. The Italian version of the channel launched on 14 September 2003; it then launched in the Netherlands on 1 August 2006. The German-speaking version of the channel launched in Germany, Austria and Switzerland on 1 February 2011.

MTV Brand New for (2011–2018) is a showcase at Electric Ballroom

MTV Brand New closed on January 10, 2011, in Italy then in Germany on January 6, 2021, and finally in the Netherlands on February 1, 2021

Concept
MTV Brand New is derived from the hit pan-European MTV music show brand:new, which launched in 1999 on MTV's regional channels. The show was known as mtv:new on the MTV Europe, brand:neu on MTV Germany and brand:new on all other MTV channels in Europe. The show focused primarily on new music releases, cutting-edge music videos, introducing new artists and bands, interviews and live performances. The programme was turned into a stand-alone music channel in Italy in 2003. Since then MTV Networks Europe has begun to roll out localized Brand New channels since 2006.

MTV Brand New closed on January 10, 2011, in Italy then in Germany on January 6, 2021, and finally in the Netherlands on February 1, 2021

Brand New Italia

Brand New Netherland

Brand: New Germany
MTV brand: new is a German Pay TV channel. The channel was announced by MTV Networks Germany at the end of 2010. The channel launched on 1 February 2011. The channel is based in Berlin and features the best in music videos from newly established German and international acts. The channel airs back-to-back new music videos, the channel will also feature chart shows such as MTV Superchart.

Yearly poll
Each January, MTV Brand New releases a poll of the same, listing the bands and singers that their viewers think will be the most successful during the coming year. Originally named Spanking New, the poll was introduced in 2008, where the winners were UK band In Case of Fire. Subsequent polls have been topped by acts such as Little Boots, Justin Bieber and Conor Maynard.

References

External links

Television channels and stations established in 2003
Television stations in Berlin
MTV channels
Television channels and stations disestablished in 2021
Defunct television channels in Germany
Defunct television channels in Italy
Defunct television channels in the Netherlands